Baltasar Garzón Real (born 26 October 1955) is a former Spanish judge. Garzón formerly served on Spain's central criminal court, the Audiencia Nacional, and was the examining magistrate of the Juzgado Central de Instrucción No. 5, which investigates the most important criminal cases in Spain, including terrorism, organised crime, and money laundering. In 2011, he was suspended from judicial activity and in 2012 he was convicted of illegal wiretapping and disbarred for a period of 11 years. During this time, Garzón legally assisted Julian Assange. On 24 March 2020, it was announced that Garzón was diagnosed with COVID-19 and hospitalized during the COVID-19 pandemic in Spain.

Early life
Born in Torres, Jaén, Garzón graduated from the University of Seville in 1979. He was appointed to the Audiencia Nacional in 1988, and rapidly made his name in Spain by pursuing the Basque separatist group ETA.

Political career
In 1993, Garzón asked for an extended leave of absence as a judge and went into politics, running for the Congress of Deputies (the lower house of parliament) as an independent candidate on the party list of the then ruling party Partido Socialista Obrero Español (PSOE). Prime Minister Felipe González appointed him head of a strengthened National Plan Against Drugs, but Garzón resigned shortly after being appointed, complaining of lack of support from the government, and returned to the Audiencia Nacional.

Spanish cases

GAL

His 1994 investigation led to the conviction of José Barrionuevo Peña, a former Interior minister, as head of the Grupos Antiterroristas de Liberación (GAL), a state terrorist group.

Drug-trafficking

Garzón made his name as a magistrate through several police operations centred on drug-trafficking in Galicia. Colombian cartels, such as the Medellín Cartel, were using the Galician mafia, already accustomed to smuggling tobacco, to smuggle drugs into Spain. In 1990, Operación Nécora led to the conviction of members of the clan led by Laureano Oubiña. The following year Garzón headed another investigation, Operación Pitón, which led to the conviction of members of the Charlines clan.

Caso Atlético
In 1999, he investigated Jesús Gil, the former mayor of Marbella and owner of Atlético Madrid, who was convicted in 2002 on grounds of corruption.

Closure of media outlets
Garzón has also presided in many trials against alleged ETA members. Falling back on the judicial presumption named "everything is ETA", he presided a case against Orain S.A., the Basque communication company that published the newspaper Egin and owned the radio station Egin Irratia. Garzón ordered the closure of both and sent some of the company officers to prison, due to their alleged links with ETA. These charges were later dropped for lack of evidence, and the journalists were released. Many years later Garzón imprisoned them again under the allegation of being part of ETA in a "broader" sense. While Egin was allowed to reopen years later by the Audiencia Nacional, the state of ruin shown by the facilities made operation impossible.

Ban of Basque parties Batasuna, EAE-ANV and EHAK
As a National Court judge, Garzón declared on 11 December 2001 that there is no ETA entourage but "everything is ETA". On 3 September 2002, he accused the Basque party Batasuna of helping and funding ETA, participating in the armed organization, and as such, involved in "crimes against humanity", also criticising any nuanced approach on Batasuna and ETA. Police shut down offices and property of the party on Garzon's orders, and suspended for three years the operations of the party. 22 members of its directive committee were arrested by 2007.

Ahead of the Spanish general election on 9 March 2008, Garzón suspended in February the Basque parties EAE-ANV and EHAK (PCTV), also ordering the closure of their headquarters, premises, establishments and any other venues, as well as blocking the parties' banking accounts. In April 2008, the judge concluded the summary that involved Batasuna to ETA, putting on trial 41 members of the party, including Arnaldo Otegi. The 61 Chamber of the Supreme Court of Spain outlawed in September the parties EAE-ANV and EHAK. In March 2009, Garzón processed 44 members constituting the directive committees of the three parties in an indictment numbering 583 pages. The judge stated that "EAE-ANV and EHAK (PCTV) were manipulated by the members of the national committee of Batasuna to continue the criminal pursuit designed by ETA".

Approach on torture

Garzón rose to prominence in the Spanish special tribunal National Court dealing with anti-terrorism in early 1990s. Basque terrorism suspects held incommunicado for days stood before court sometimes with clear signs of violence on their body. As a judge, he used to ignore right away apparent injuries detainees' bodies, as well as their statements describing their period in police hands, labelling injuries "self-inflicted", or irrelevant, and failing to investigate the cases. Approximately 100 Basques and Catalans may have been tortured under the jurisdiction of Baltasar Garzón as a judge.

Francoist atrocities

On 17 October 2008, Garzón formally declared the acts of repression committed by the Franco regime to be crimes against humanity, and accounted them in more than one hundred thousand killings during and after the Spanish Civil War. He also ordered the exhumation of 19 unmarked mass graves, one of them believed to contain the remains of the poet Federico García Lorca.

On 17 November 2008, Garzón said that he was dropping the investigation against Franco and his allies after state prosecutors had questioned his jurisdiction over crimes committed 70 years ago by people who are now dead and whose crimes were covered by an amnesty passed in 1977. In a 152-page statement, he passed responsibility to regional courts for opening 19 mass graves believed to hold the remains of hundreds of victims.

Caso Gürtel 

Garzón started a major corruption inquiry, code-named "Gürtel" from the name of its ringleader, Franscisco Correa, ("Gürtel" being German for "belt", which is the meaning of "correa" in Spanish). The case was related to bribes given to People's Party. He was disposed of the case in 2010.

Allegation of improper eavesdropping
The accused in the case sought to have evidence against them ignored. The accused asked that the evidence be ruled inadmissible, since it was obtained from conversations between prisoners and counsel, which, under Spanish law, it is claimed, is allowed only in terrorism-related cases.

Garzón's authorisation of the recordings resulted in his disbarment as a judge and lawyer.

International cases

Augusto Pinochet

On 10 October 1998, Garzón issued an international warrant for the arrest of former Chilean dictator Augusto Pinochet for the alleged deaths and torture of Spanish citizens. The Chilean Truth Commission (1990–91) report was the basis for the warrant, marking an unprecedented use of universal jurisdiction to attempt to try a former dictator for a crime committed abroad. Eventually it was turned down by British Home Secretary Jack Straw, who rejected Garzón's request to have Pinochet extradited to Spain on health grounds.

Kissinger and Operation Condor
Garzón asked for permission for cross-examination of former U.S. Secretary of State Henry Kissinger in connection with a plot in the 1970s known as Operation Condor. Permission was refused.

Dirty War
Garzón also filed charges of genocide against Argentine military officers on Dirty War's disappearance of Spanish citizens during Argentina's 1976–1983 dictatorship. Eventually, Adolfo Scilingo and Miguel Angel Cavallo were prosecuted in separate cases. Scilingo was convicted and sentenced to over 1,000 years incarceration for his crimes.

Guantanamo
Garzón issued indictments for five Guantanamo detainees, including Spaniard Abderrahman Ahmad and Jordanian Jamil El Banna. Ahmad was extradited to Spain on 14 February 2004. El Banna was released to the United Kingdom, and in 2007, Garzón dropped the charges against him on humanitarian grounds.

Bush Six

In March 2009, Garzón considered whether Spain should allow charges to be filed against former officials from the United States government under George W. Bush for offering justifications for torture. The six former Bush officials are: Alberto Gonzales, former Attorney General John Yoo, of the Office of Legal Counsel; Douglas Feith, former undersecretary of defense for policy; William Haynes II, former general counsel for the Department of Defense; Jay Bybee, also at Justice Department's Office of Legal Counsel; and David Addington, Vice President Dick Cheney's Chief of Staff. However, the investigation was assigned to Judge Eloy Velasco who chose not to pursue it stating that Spain could not investigate the case if the U.S. did not intend to conduct its own investigation into the matter.

On 29 April 2009, Garzón opened an investigation into an alleged "systematic programme" of torture at Guantánamo Bay, following accusations by four former prisoners. Similarly, the leaked cable indicates that the Chief Prosecutor intended to also fight this investigation and that he feared, "Garzón may attempt to wring all the publicity he can from the case unless and until he is forced to give it up."

In September 2009, the Spanish newspaper Público reported that, despite opposition, Garzón was proceeding to the next phase of his investigation.

Alex Saab
On 22 July 2020, Garzón said that he would represent Colombian businessman Alex Saab in a U.S. extradition case, indicted with money laundering charges.

Appearance before the Spanish Supreme Court
The Supreme Court of Spain has declared admissible three criminal accusations against Garzón for 'prevarication' which implies using his authority as a judge to intentionally subvert the course of justice. This is a very serious criminal offense punishable by suspension from any (Spanish) judicial activity for up to twenty years.

Crimes against humanity by Franco's government
In October 2008, Garzón opened a controversial inquiry into alleged crimes against humanity committed by the Nationalist government during the Spanish Civil War and the years that followed the war. This action was controversial because the offenses were nearly 70 years old, occurring before the concept of crimes against humanity, and a 1977 general amnesty act barred any investigations related to criminal offenses with a political aim previous to 1976. In 2008, the inquiry was suspended. In September 2009, a trade union called "Manos limpias" (Clean Hands) filed a lawsuit against Garzón alleging that Garzón had abused his judicial authority by opening the inquiry. Manos Limpias is a "far-right group," according to The New York Times. Garzón denied any wrongdoing.

In April 2010, Garzón was indicted by the Spanish Supreme Court for prevarication for arbitrarily changing his juridical criteria to engineer the case in order to bypass the law limiting his jurisdiction. If convicted, he could have been barred from his duties for 20 years. Garzón's indictment has been highly divisive within Spain and controversial abroad. Amnesty International and Human Rights Watch condemned the indictment, and The New York Times published an editorial supporting him, whereas The Wall Street Journal condemned Garzón's proceedings in an editorial supporting the rule of law. There were public protests in Spain from left wing organizations supporting Garzón.

The International Commission of Jurists considers that his short-lived inquiry did not justify disciplinary action, let alone criminal prosecution, adding that the prosecution of judges for carrying out their professional work was "an inappropriate and unwarranted interference with the independence of the judicial process".

On 24 April 2010, Garzón presented an appeal to the Supreme Court against the judge investigating the case, Luciano Varela for giving advice to the plaintiffs about the errors in their documents. Garzón accused the judge of partiality, in having "a direct interest in the proceedings and bias in the action" and having "worked closely with the plaintiffs by offering counsel or legal advice" intended help the complainants to correct a defect in their series of indictments to meet a deadline, an action which he defined as "atypical, extrajudicial and prejudicial to one of the parties" (i.e. him, as the accused). According to Garzón, "intervention by the instructing judge is not protected under any provision of the current legal procedural rules and is clearly unrelated to the substantive rules of Spanish court procedure". Luciano Varela accepted the appeal and temporarily stepped out from the case until the Supreme Court rules on the appeal.

On 11 May 2010, Luis Moreno-Ocampo, chief prosecutor of the International Criminal Court (ICC) requested that the Judiciary of Spain might assign Garzón as a consultant to the ICC for six months, which would have allowed General Council of the Judicial Power of Spain (La Comisión Permanente Extraordinaria del Consejo General del Poder Juidicial or CGPJ) to avoid suspending Garzón during the impending trial for investigating crimes committed during the Francisco Franco era.

In response, Judge Varela brought forward his conclusion that Garzón should stand trial, and the CGPJ rejected the request of the ICC on the basis that it appeared to be simply a personal request by Moreno-Ocampo, rather than an official ICC invitation. On Friday, 14 May 2010, Garzón was duly suspended from judicial activity (with pay) 'as a precaution, pending judgment' as a result of the decision of Judge Varela, which causes suspension to be formally required by Spanish law. The CGPC subsequently declared that it would require five different certificates ('informes' in Spanish) to release Garzón to the ICC as a consultant for six months during his period of suspension from judicial activity. These were:

 That the public prosecutor (which opposes the trial of Garzón) certify that there would be no conflict of interest
 That the Supreme Court of Spain (hearing the case against Garzón) would not be delayed or inconvenienced
 That the ICC certify the appointment would not provide immunity for Garzón from either outstanding or future criminal process in Spain
 That Spain's Ministry of Foreign Affairs and Cooperation declare the appointment of Garzón to be in the national interest of Spain
 That the Secretary General of the CGPJ was satisfied that all of the above certificates were appropriate and legally valid for this temporary assignment.

José Manuel Gómez Begresista, the president of the CGPJ's Commission for Studies and Reports, impugned each of the above five conditions, which he characterized as 'ridiculous' since Garzón had previously been assigned to such work, and no immunity from Spanish law attaches thereto. He went on to state that the decision taken by the CGPJ "lacked any legal grounds whatsoever".

Later that day, the CGPJ authorised the assignment of Garzón to the ICC.

ECHR: Kononov v. Latvia 
Coincidentally, on the same day, the Grand Chamber of the European Court of Human Rights in Strasbourg delivered final judgment in the case Vassili Kononov v. Latvia No. 36376/04, on 17 May 2010.

The Russian Federation had maintained that any prosecution of the applicant was statute-barred, as supported by the dissenting opinion of Judge Costa joined by judges Kalaydjieva and Poalelungi, : under "Article 15 of the European Convention on Human Rights no derogation is permissible and in conclusion, the dissident judges considered that, in respect of Article 7 of the European Convention on Human Rights

However, in the prevailing and joint concurring opinion of judges Rozakis, Tulkens, Spielmann and Jebens:

Since the Spanish State of Franco had laws against kidnapping and killing, it might be difficult to argue that these acts were legal, even if they were directed by (Francoist) state officials, particularly as Garzón convicted the PSOE government officials promoting the GAL assassination squads.

Impartiality questions
On 17 December 2010, Garzón challenged five of the seven Supreme Court justices that could be appointed to judge him for his activities in respect of the exhumation of Franco victims.

He alleges that Juan Saavedra, Adolfo Prego Oliver, Joaquin Giménez, Francisco and Juan Ramon Berdugo Monterde should be disqualified from officiating in any way because they have participated in pre-trial activities and thus may have an interest in the outcome that might affect their impartiality. These five judges have intervened in the investigation of the case, and the defence claims that consequently – and according to a strict interpretation of the principle of nemo iudex in causa sua – such intervention demonstrates these five judges an indirect interest in the outcome of the process.

The background to this case is that conservative opinion generally asserts that "the dictatorship" is past, and exhuming its less savoury activities is injurious to modern Spanish political interests (as may be Garzón's extraterritorial attempts to accuse foreign nationals of crimes against humanity).

Certainly founding members of the People's Party, such as Manuel Fraga, were members of Franco's government, and there may be a fear that the more aggressively socialist opposition may wish to use these exhumations to imply thereby the intentions of modern Spanish political leaders may be less than entirely democratic, and that established political entities may seek to influence the course of justice (for example – between 2005 and 2010 – when the PP and PSOE denied the Spanish Senate the necessary majority to approve fresh judges for the Constitutional Court of Spain)

Banco Santander corruption allegation
The allegation is that Garzón dropped (adjourned sine die) a case against the director of Santander, Emilio Botín, in return for sponsorship by the bank of some university courses delivered in New York by Garzón between 2005 and 2006.

This appeal to the Supreme Court follows a charge previously closed by the criminal court on 27 November 2006, since the alleged 1.2 million euro fee was deemed by the lower court to be in fact 216,000 euros, which was not paid to Garzón, but to the university foundation.

The Supreme Court investigating judge insisted that there was clear evidence of wrongdoing involving some US$2.5 million, but, because the complaint was originally laid on 12 June 2009, but the last payment was made in May 2006 the three-year statute of limitations relating to the Supreme Court had been exceeded by 25 days. It was not clear why the case, previously archived by a provincial court on 27 November 2006 was not referred back to the lower court where a 15-year statute of limitations applies provided there is disclosure of 'further and better evidence' which might then lead to a jury trial.

This Supreme Court corruption case against Garzón was closed on 13 February 2012, on the next-but-one working day after Garzón's conviction for bugging the Gürtel corruption suspects.

Supreme Court trial
On 9 February 2012, the Supreme Court ruled that judge Baltasar Garzón was guilty of illegally ordering the placement of wiretaps in jailhouses to record conversations between inmates and their lawyers in a case of corruption. Under Spanish law, such wiretaps are only expressly permitted for terrorism cases and the legality of their use in other cases is more vague. The Supreme Court also barred Garzón from the legal profession for 11 years. The court said: "Garzón's methods are typical of totalitarian countries, without any respect of the right of defence."
Since Garzon can not appeal the charges, his career as a judge is likely to have ended. He was also fined €2,500. People protested the trial and ruling outside the court with banners calling for "justice" and photos of the people said to have been killed by the Franco regime. Many other judges also came out in support of Garzón.

Given the severity of the accusations against the Supreme Court, a large number of persons and institutions issued statements in support of the ruling. The progressive Judges for Democracy association stated that "The Supreme Court and any other criminal court can only be asked to apply the law and respect the presumption of innocence. This must be both in determining the facts and in interpreting the norm. Whether or not one agrees with the Court's decision and the interpretation on which it is founded, we must state that the Supreme Court has ruled in this context and should not be disqualified as such an institution for it.
Margarita Robles, member of the General Council of the Judiciary and former Subsecretary of State with the socialist government, said that the Supreme Court ruling was "legally impeccable" and had been produced as part of a procedure "with all the guarantees."
It was later revealed that the Supreme Court had made a mistake in sentencing by overlooking the fact the Garzón had been suspended for nearly a year in the period 2010/2011 solely on the basis of his pending trial on a charge relating to his investigation of Francoist atrocities, a charge on which he was subsequently cleared.

Allegations of politicisation of the judiciary
In June 2010, Garzón was recruited as a consultant to the ICC.

At the end of October 2010, the re-election of Judge Juan Saavedra to the Spanish Supreme Court Penal Division reactivated the three judicial processes against Garzón. The re-appointment of a right-wing judge may have suggested to the Spanish legal authorities that the complaints had sufficient weight to merit continuing the domestic process despite the rulings in the European Court of Human Rights cited above.

The alleged "political colonisation" of the Spanish judiciary is an increasingly recurrent theme in the Spanish centre/left-wing media. More than 1,500 Spanish judges earlier this year criticised the influence of the major parties in the decisions of the Supreme Judicial Council (CGPJ) via a manifesto that for the first time exposed publicly what was claimed to be a long-standing open secret among Spanish lawyers.

In a 2011 book, Garzón wrote that he had at times exceeded the provisions of domestic Spanish legislation, but quoted external sources, including international treaties, to explain his behavior.

Other work
In July 2012, WikiLeaks founder Julian Assange recruited the disbarred Garzón as head of his legal team.

In September 2012, Garzón wrote an article in The Journal Jurisprudence outlining his views on sexual violence during wartimes.

Awards and honors

2009 Hermann Kesten Prize
2010 International Hrant Dink Award
2010 Prix René Cassin awarded by Jeune République, after a jury decision composed by Dominique de Villepin, Luis Moreno-Ocampo, Bertrand Badie, Stanley Hoffmann, Souleymane Bashir Diagne, Eva Joly, Mireille Delmas Marty and others. The work was designed by Miquel Barcelo (May 2010)
2011 Kant-Weltbürger-Preis, in Freiburg i.Br. in Germany, after a jury decision of the Kant Gesellschaft. The papers of the ceremony on 7 May 2011 were published in Berthold Lange (Hrsg.), Weltbürgerrrecht, Ergon Verlag, Würzburg, 2012. .Prix

Garzón was awarded 22 Honoris Causa Doctoral Degrees in 10 years, between 1999 and November 2009: 16 from Latin American countries, two from the US, two from the UK, and one from Belgium. His 22nd "Honoris Causa" Doctoral Degree award, awarded by the University of Jaén on 9 November 2009, was his first to be received in Spain.

Bibliography
 (Christmas tale: A different world is possible), Ediciones de la Tierra (2002)
 (A world without fear), Plaza & Janes, S.A. and Debolsillo (February 2005)
Practical tips to prevent, know, and act), Begoña del Pueyo, Alejandro Perales (Editorial Grijalbo) (June 2005)
 (The fight against terrorism and its limits), Adhara Publicaciones, S.L. (February 2006)
Denis Robert, Stock, 1996. Interviews and portrait of seven anticorruption judges: Bernard Bertossa, Edmondo Bruti Liberati, Gherardo Colombo, Benoît Dejemeppe, Baltasar Garzón Real, Carlos Jimenez Villarejo, Renaud Van Ruymbeke

See also 
Carmelo Soria, Spanish diplomat assassinated in 1976 by the Chilean DINA
Command responsibility

References

External links

Biography at SpainView
Judge Garzón: Introduction to a Life, article at Stanford
BBC News – Profile: Judge Baltasar Garzon
Judge Garzon Support Page
Baltasar Garzón y José María Mena en Canal-L: "El crimen organizado siempre busca espacios de impunidad"

1955 births
20th-century Spanish judges
21st-century Spanish judges
Censorship in Spain
Living people
People from the Province of Jaén (Spain)
Spanish socialists
University of Seville alumni